Aero Trasporti Italiani Flight 12 was a domestic flight from Alghero-Fertilia Airport. On September 14, 1979, The Douglas DC-9 struck a rocky mountainside during an attempted landing, resulting in the loss of all 31 passengers and crew on board. The crash was caused by misinterpreting ATC instructions leading to the flight colliding with terrain.

Aircraft 

The aircraft had logged about 10000 hours at the time of the crash.

Flight 

The first officer contacted the controller at Cagliari at 00:23, asking for a weather report. He also stated there were thunderstorms without precipitation, south-east and south-west of the airport.
Having in front of them a consistent formation of cumulonimbus clouds, the first officer radioed their intention to make a 360° turn to further lower the altitude and thus avoid the cloud formations.
The controller then asked the flight if they had visual contact with the ground, but this was not the case. The clearance was amended to go down to 6000 feet instead of 3000 feet.
Art 00:30 the flight reported that it was in visual contact with the ground, and that it was about to leave 6000 ft for 3000 ft. The controller confirmed this, adding that it had started to rain at the airport in the meantime.
The aircraft however did not complete the planned 360° turn, thus finding itself with a different heading from that initially planned.
After reaching 3000 feet, the flight was cleared for the approach. The first officer confirmed this and announced that they would start the final approach with a slight deviation to the right of the beacon.
At 00:34 the first officer asked the controller to confirm that the ILS system was inoperative, which it was. At this stage of the flight the crew became unaware of their position. The captain believed he was flying over the sea, further south than the actual position of the aircraft, while the first officer rightly believed he was flying over the mountainous terrain of southern Sardinia.
In the last minute and a half of the flight, the captain asked the first officer to lower the undercarriage and continued the descent.
At an altitude of 2000 feet (610 m) the DC-9 hit the rocky mountainside of Conca d'Oru with the lower part of the fuselage, causing the aircraft to break up. A fire erupted.

References

1979 disasters in Italy
Aviation accidents and incidents in 1979
Aviation accidents and incidents in Italy